Tor Milde (14 January 1953 – 15 January 2014) was a Norwegian music journalist and writer. He was a judge on the music competition Idol in 2005 and 2006.

Born in Oslo, he began his career in journalism in 1984 and was best known as a music journalist and critic for Verdens Gang (VG).

Tor Milde died following a brief illness on the morning of 15 January 2014, aged 61, at the Ullevål University Hospital in his hometown of Oslo. He was survived by his two sons and his girlfriend, Irja Anthi.

References

External links

1953 births
2014 deaths
Writers from Oslo
Norwegian journalists
Verdens Gang people
Norwegian writers
Norwegian music critics
Norwegian music journalists